Pauli Pitkänen (4 November 1911 –  28 September 1941) was a Finnish cross-country skier who competed in the 1930s. He won three gold medals at the FIS Nordic World Ski Championships with two in 1938 (18 km and 4 × 10 km relay) and one in 1939 (4 × 10 km relay). He was born in Nilsiä. He was killed during the Continuation War.

Cross-country skiing results
All results are sourced from the International Ski Federation (FIS).

World Championships
 3 medals – (3 gold)

References

External links

1911 births
1941 deaths
Finnish male cross-country skiers
Finnish military personnel killed in World War II
FIS Nordic World Ski Championships medalists in cross-country skiing
People from Kuopio Province (Grand Duchy of Finland)
People from Nilsiä
Sportspeople from North Savo
20th-century Finnish people